"Mahalo" is a Hawaiian word meaning thanks, gratitude, admiration, praise, esteem, regards, or respects. According to the Pukui and Elbert Hawaiian Dictionary, it is derived from the Proto-Polynesian *masalo.

Some sources support that the meanings "thanks" and "gratitude" were appended to the word following contact with Westerners. While the word mahalo is found in Lorrin Andrews' 1865 dictionary, the English-Hawaiian section does not provide any Hawaiian word intended to mean gratitude or thanks.
Also, early visitors noted that the Hawaiians were generous and grateful people, but had no word to express gratitude or to say "thank you".

See also
Aloha

References

Hawaiian words and phrases
Hawaiiana

fr:Mahalo
it:Mahalo